West Virginia's 15th Senate district is one of 17 districts in the West Virginia Senate. It is currently represented by Republicans Craig Blair and Charles S. Trump. All districts in the West Virginia Senate elect two members to staggered four-year terms.

Geography
District 15 is based in the state's Eastern Panhandle, covering all of Hampshire and Morgan Counties and parts of Berkeley and Mineral Counties. Communities within the district include Fort Ashby, Wiley Ford, Romney, Berkeley Springs, and Inwood.

The district is largely within West Virginia's 2nd congressional district, with a small portion extending into the 1st district. It overlaps with the 54th, 56th, 57th, 58th, 59th, 60th, 61st, 62nd, 63rd, and 64th districts of the West Virginia House of Delegates. It borders the states of Maryland and Virginia.

Recent election results

2022

Historical election results

2020

2018

2016

2014

2012

Federal and statewide results in District 15

References

15
Berkeley County, West Virginia
Hampshire County, West Virginia
Mineral County, West Virginia
Morgan County, West Virginia